Sylvia Schlettwein (born 16 November 1975) is a Namibian writer, teacher, translator and literary critic. She was the Head of the Department for Languages and Communication at the International University of Management in the capital Windhoek.

Biography
Schlettwein was born in Omaruru.  Her publication Bullies, Beasts and Beauties, is a collection of short stories co-authored with Isabella Morris. She received a Highly Commended Award in the 2010 Commonwealth Short Story competition for her story “Framing the Nation” and was selected for the 2011 FEMRITE Residency for African Women Writers in Kampala, Uganda. In 2012 she attended the Kwani? Litfest within the framework of the Moving Africa Programme by the Goethe-Institut.

Serubiri Moses highlights a kind of individual feminist tendency in her story "Mother of the Beast", from the anthology Summoning the Rains, when he says "It is twisted in a way that puts self-individualism at the forefront without seeming too crude or too bitter. Everyone seems to try, but eventually give up. She in turn is left alone in that last scene with her jackal fur wrapped around her shoulders, failing to pull together her family life or her work life, left in a trance, bleak and abandoned."

Selected works

References

1975 births
Living people
Namibian short story writers
People from Omaruru
Namibian women critics
Namibian women short story writers
21st-century translators
Namibian translators
21st-century short story writers
20th-century Namibian women writers
21st-century Namibian women writers